Kolvi Mandi Rajendra pura is a census town in Jhalawar district in the Indian state of Rajasthan.it is also a beautiful town.there are many of temples.

Demographics
 India census, Kolvi Mandi Rajendra pura had a population of 15089. Males constitute 52% of the population and females 48%. Kolvi Mandi Rajendra pura has an average literacy rate of 68%, higher than the national average of 59.5%: male literacy is 76%, and female literacy is 59%. In Kolvi Mandi Rajendra pura, 15% of the population is under 6 years of age.

References

Cities and towns in Jhalawar district